Warren Township is a township in Wayne County, Iowa, USA.

History
Warren Township is named for General Joseph Warren. It composes an area of 525 square miles.

References

Townships in Wayne County, Iowa
Townships in Iowa